Netherleigh House, (commonly known as Netherleigh) is a Government Building in Belfast, Northern Ireland which serves as the headquarters for the Department for the Economy, Northern Ireland (formerly the Department of Enterprise, Trade and Investment) and the offices of the minister for that department.

The building is located on Massey Avenue, close to the Stormont Estate and Campbell College. It was built around 1875 and is thought to have been designed by WH Lynn. Only part of the original structure remains, the rest having been demolished.

Netherleigh House, has had a number of owners including a linen merchant and a politician Major Samuel Hall-Thompson, before it became a preparatory school for Campbell College, then government offices.  

The building was extended, with two office blocks built to the south and east of Netherleigh.

References

Buildings and structures in Belfast